|}

The Sandy Lane Stakes is a Group 2 flat horse race in Great Britain open to horses aged three years only.
It is run at Haydock Park over a distance of 6 furlongs (1,207 metres), and it is scheduled to take place each year in late May or early June.

The race had Listed status prior to 2015. It was raised to Group 2 level as part of a set of changes to sprint races in Great Britain.

Winners since 1985

See also
 Horse racing in Great Britain
 List of British flat horse races

References

Paris-Turf:
Racing Post:

 ifhaonline.org – International Federation of Horseracing Authorities – Sandy Lane Stakes (2019).

Flat races in Great Britain
Haydock Park Racecourse
Flat horse races for three-year-olds